Roman Stepanov (born 21 January 1986) is a Ukrainian footballer who most recently played for FC Volyn Lutsk.

Stepanov previously played for FC Dinamo Brest in Belarus.

External links
 
 
 

1986 births
Living people
Ukrainian footballers
Association football midfielders
Ukrainian expatriate footballers
Expatriate footballers in Belarus
FC Volyn Lutsk players
FC Kovel-Volyn Kovel players
FC Ikva Mlyniv players
FC Skala Stryi (2004) players
FC Dynamo Brest players
FC Enerhetyk Burshtyn players
FC Lviv players